The Men's Slalom competition in the 2016 FIS Alpine Skiing World Cup involved 11 events, including one parallel slalom (specifically, a city event, which only includes 16 racers). However, the city event was moved from Munich on 1 January to Stockholm on 23 February due to organization issues.  The last race of the season was at the World Cup finals in St. Moritz. 

Marcel Hirscher of Austria had won the discipline for the prior three seasons, but this season Henrik Kristoffersen of Norway won six of the first seven races to build a 180-point lead over Hirscher at that point.  Although Hirscher won two of the next three races, Kristoffersen still had a 111-point lead with only one race to go, clinching his victory for the season.

Standings
 

Updated at 21 March 2016 after all events.

See also
 2016 Alpine Skiing World Cup – Men's summary rankings
 2016 Alpine Skiing World Cup – Men's Overall
 2016 Alpine Skiing World Cup – Men's Downhill
 2016 Alpine Skiing World Cup – Men's Super-G
 2016 Alpine Skiing World Cup – Men's Giant Slalom
 2016 Alpine Skiing World Cup – Men's Combined

References

External links
 Alpine Skiing at FIS website

Men's Slalom
FIS Alpine Ski World Cup slalom men's discipline titles